The following features lists of the film, television and stage performances of actress and singer Jeanette MacDonald (1903 – 1965). She is best remembered for her musical films of the 1930s with Maurice Chevalier (The Love Parade, Love Me Tonight, The Merry Widow and One Hour With You) and Nelson Eddy (Naughty Marietta, Rose-Marie, and Maytime), but she starred in 29 feature films between 1929 and 1950, from operas to dramas to romantic comedies.

Filmography

Box Office Ranking

1936 - 9th (US)
1937 - 13th (US), 7th (UK)
1938 - 14th (US), 2nd (UK)
1939 - 19th (US), 5th (UK)
1940 - 4th (UK)
1941 - 5th (UK)
1942 - 5th (UK)

Television
Jeanette MacDonald in Performance: The Voice of Firestone Season 2 Episode 11 Nov 13, 1950
Jeanette MacDonald – "The Ed Sullivan Show" Episodes 5.17 and 4.47 (1951)
Jeanette MacDonald in "Toast of the Town" Season 3 Episode 47. August 5, 1951
Jeanette MacDonald on "Toast of the Town" Season 4 Episode 17. Top Stars of 1951. December 30, 1951
Jeanette MacDonald on "Texaco Star Theater" Season 4 Episode 37. May 27, 1952
Jeanette MacDonald – "This Is Your Life" Ralph Edwards Productions Nov.12, 1952 
Jeanette MacDonald- "What's My Line" Season 4 Episode 16. December 21, 1952
Jeanette MacDonald- "The Name's the Same" December 30, 1952
Jeanette MacDonald- "I've Got a Secret" September 2, 1953
Jeanette MacDonald- "The Jackie Gleason Show" Guest Vocalist. 1953
Jeanette MacDonald as Martha. Prima Donna – "Screen Director's Playhouse" Season 1 Episode 17 February 1, 1956
Jeanette MacDonald- "The Lux Video Theatre Hollywood Musical Holiday Revue" Season 7 Episode 13 December 20, 1956
Jeanette MacDonald- Playhouse 90 Charley's Aunt'' Season 1 Episode 26. March 28, 1957
Jeanette MacDonald on "The Big Record". Season 1 Episode 2. September 25, 1957
Jeanette MacDonald on "Person to Person" Season 6 Episode 6. October 31, 1958
Jeanette MacDonald on "The Jack Parr Show". Season 3 Episode 51. December 1, 1959

Selected stage work

References

Further reading

Citations

Actress filmographies
Screen and stage
American filmographies